Stuck (stylised as #Stuck) is a 2014 American romantic comedy film directed by Stuart Acher and started by Madeline Zima and Joel David Moore.

Plot
Two strangers, who just had a one-night stand, are forced to spend the morning together when they got stuck in a dead-stopped traffic congestion.

Cast
 Madeline Zima as Holly
 Joel David Moore as Guy
 Abraham Benrubi as Bartender

Reception
The review aggregator website Rotten Tomatoes reported an approval rating of 60%, based on 10 reviews. Frank Scheck on his review for The Hollywood Reporter wrote: "Stuck is too slight to make us care about whether its characters ultimately get together. Moore displays a low-key deadpan charm and Zima, although a little too prone to constant giggling, is sexy and charming. But by the time the film is over, viewers are likely to wind up feeling like they’ve been stuck in traffic themselves". Michael Rechtshaffen from the newspaper Los Angeles Times called the movie a "a talky adult comedy that finally succumbs to the confines of its setting despite a cute setup". Serena Donadoni from The Village Voice gave the film a more favorable review, stating: "While Holly and Guy are parked on the freeway, Acher’s widescreen camera also wanders off to explore the surrounding vehicles, capturing moments of exasperation and humor. Acher adroitly juggles all the gimmickry, using it to comment on Holly and Guy’s burgeoning relationship".

References

External links
 
 

2014 romantic comedy films
2010s English-language films
American romantic comedy films
2010s American films